Halse is both a surname and a given name. Notable people with the name include:

Surname:
Arne Halse (1887–1975), Norwegian athlete who specialized in the different forms of javelin throw
Clive Halse (1935–2002), South African cricketer
Emmeline Halse (1853–1930), English sculptor
George Halse (1826–1895), English sculptor and poet
Harold Halse (1886–1949), English soccer player who played most of his career for Manchester United
Kristian Halse (born 1926), Norwegian politician for the Liberal Party
Laurie Halse Anderson (born Laurie Beth Halse, 1961), American author
Sir Nicholas Halse (died 1636), Governor of Pendennis Castle in Cornwall, England
Sir Reginald Halse (1881–1962), Archbishop of Brisbane

Given name:
Halse Rogers Arnott (1879–1961), Australian medical practitioner, company director and chairman of Arnott's
Percival Halse Rogers (1883–1945), Australian jurist and university chancellor